Marguerite Chaudoir (19 November 1885 – 24 December 1967) was a Belgian tennis player. She competed in the women's doubles event at the 1920 Summer Olympics.

References

External links
 

1885 births
1967 deaths
Belgian female tennis players
Olympic tennis players of Belgium
Tennis players at the 1920 Summer Olympics
Sportspeople from Liège
20th-century Belgian women